T15 or T-15 may refer to:

Aerospace 
 T15 (satellite), a DirecTV communications satellite
 Marlin Airport, Texas, United States
 Slingsby T.15 Gull III, a British glider
 Soyuz T-15, a crewed spaceflight

Automobiles 
 Chery T15, a Chinese concept car
 Simca-Gordini T15, a French racing car
 Triumph T15 Terrier, a motorcycle

Railway stations 
 Minami-Sunamachi Station, Tokyo, Japan
 Nangō-Jūsan-Chōme Station, Sapporo, Hokkaido, Japan
 Nijō Station (Kyoto), Japan
 Sanuki-Tsuda Station, Kagawa, Japan
 Sekime-Takadono Station, Osaka, Japan
 Yagoto Station, Nagoya, Aichi, Japan

Weapons and armour 
 Safir T-15, a rifle
 Škoda T-15, a prototype German-Czechoslovakian light tank
 T-15 torpedo, a Soviet nuclear torpedo
 T-15 Armata, a Russian infantry fighting vehicle
 Vickers T-15 light tank, of the Belgian Army

Other uses 
 T-15 (reactor), a Russian fusion research reactor
 Estonian national road 15
 
 Little Swanport language